The World Group I Play-offs were four ties which involved the losing nations of the World Group and the winning nations of the World Group II. Nations that won their play-off ties entered the 2019 World Group, while losing nations joined the 2019 World Group II.

Belarus vs. Slovakia

Romania vs. Switzerland

Australia vs. Netherlands

Italy vs. Belgium

References 

World Group Play-offs